Marcelo Fabián Grioni (born 27 July 1966) is an Argentine football manager and former player who played as a midfielder. He is the current manager of Peruvian club UTC.

Playing career
Grioni was born in Marcos Juárez, and was a Newell's Old Boys youth graduate. After making his first team debut in 1987, he appeared rarely and moved to Correcaminos UAT for a short spell, but never played.

Back to his home country in 1989, Grioni featured regularly for Almirante Brown before joining top-tier side Platense in 1992. He returned to Brown in the following year, but failed to settle for a team for the remainder of his career, and went on to represent Almirante Brown, Atlético Tucumán, Gimnasia y Tiro, Deportivo Morón, Argentino de Rosario and Douglas Haig. He retired with the latter in 2000, aged 34.

Managerial career
Grioni started his career in 2004, as Pablo Marini's assistant at Argentino de Rosario. He then followed Marini to Newell's Old Boys in 2007, before joining Roberto Sensini's staff at Estudiantes de La Plata in 2008.

Grioni continued to work with Sensini at Newell's and Colón before being named manager of Douglas Haig on 15 September 2013. He resigned on 26 November, and returned to work with Sensini at Atlético de Rafaela after a brief spell at Racing Teodelina.

In 2016, Grioni moved to Peru, after being named manager of Deportivo Municipal's reserve sides. He was named interim manager in February, before being appointed permanent manager in the following month.

On 20 May 2017, Grioni was sacked from Municipal, and took over Real Garcilaso on 1 June. On 12 December, after his contract was due to expire, he was named in charge of Sport Huancayo.

Grioni was relieved from his duties on 26 March 2019, and was appointed in charge of Cienciano on 11 June. He achieved promotion to the top tier with the club as champions in his first season, and after narrowly missing out qualification to the Copa Sudamericana in his second, he renewed his contract until 2022 on 14 July 2020.

Honours

Manager
Cienciano
Peruvian Segunda División: 2019

References

External links

1966 births
Living people
Sportspeople from Córdoba Province, Argentina
Argentine footballers
Association football midfielders
Argentine Primera División players
Primera Nacional players
Newell's Old Boys footballers
Club Atlético Platense footballers
Club Almirante Brown footballers
Atlético Tucumán footballers
Gimnasia y Tiro footballers
Deportivo Morón footballers
Argentino de Rosario footballers
Club Atlético Douglas Haig players
Correcaminos UAT footballers
Argentine expatriate footballers
Argentine expatriate sportspeople in Mexico
Expatriate football managers in Mexico
Argentine football managers
Peruvian Primera División managers
Deportivo Municipal managers
Sport Huancayo managers
Cienciano managers
Argentine expatriate football managers
Argentine expatriate sportspeople in Peru
Expatriate football managers in Peru
Cusco FC managers
Universidad Técnica de Cajamarca managers